Malcolm Smith (born 23 January 1959) is a Bermudian sailor. He competed in the Laser event at the 1996 Summer Olympics.

References

External links
 
 

1959 births
Living people
Bermudian male sailors (sport)
Olympic sailors of Bermuda
Sailors at the 1996 Summer Olympics – Laser
Place of birth missing (living people)